Thomas James Edmonds, (AM, BA, DipEd, DipT, MACE), is an Australian singer who was born in South Australia, Australia.  He graduated from the University of Adelaide and the Adelaide Teachers College with a Diploma of Teaching and Education and a Bachelor of Arts Degree.  In 1961 he became a foundation member of the staff of Westminster School in Marion, and in 1965, he was appointed Deputy Headmaster of the School.

Edmonds began his singing studies in Australia in 1960 and, in 1970, he continued both singing and education studies in England and Europe.

An internationally renowned opera singer, he has appeared in oratorios and many operas, including Mozart operas Don Giovanni (as "Don Ottavio"), and The Abduction From the Seraglio (as "Belmonte"), amongst others.

He also appeared in State Opera of South Australia production of the Gilbert and Sullivan opera "H.M.S. Pinafore" as Ralph Rackstraw, alongside Dennis Olsen and Judith Henley.  The production was broadcast, throughout Australia, as a simultaneous television and stereo radio broadcast, by the Australian Broadcasting Corporation.

Edmonds has sung in opera at Covent Garden and the Edinburgh Festival and has appeared with the British Broadcasting Corporation as well as appearing in concert in the UK and Europe.

Edmonds won eight successive Showcase TV series Grand Finals (beginning with Showcase 68), in which he won both the judges' vote and the television viewers' vote). He also won the Shell Aria Award.

Edmonds won the Australian National Eisteddfod Operatic Aria competition in 1969 and was one of the judges at the 51st Adelaide Eisteddfod during April 2006.

Edmonds received a Medal of the Order of Australia (OAM) in 1982 and was made a Member of the Order of Australia (AM) in the 1987 Queen's Birthday Honours.

Recordings

Thomas Edmonds recordings with RCA includes:

 "The Voice of Thomas Edmonds"
 "Wonderful Day, with Thomas Edmonds"
 "Thomas Edmonds on Tour"
 "Songs of the Open Road"
 "Remember with Thomas Edmonds"
 "Thomas Edmonds Sings Opera"
 "Serenade in Italy"
 "Thomas Edmonds Sings Songs of Faith"
 "By Request"
 "Gilbert & Sullivan Highlights"

References

 "The Voice of Thomas Edmonds" — LP album notes
Thomas Edmonds and "H.M.S. Pinafore" - Gilbert and Sullivan Discography and review about the State Opera of South Australia's production of the opera
Thomas Edmonds and Dennis Olsen - Gilbert and Sullivan Highlights compact disc information
Australian National Eisteddfod Operatic Aria Winners - 1955 to Present
 Vision Australia

External links

Australian operatic tenors
Musicians from Adelaide
Living people
Year of birth missing (living people)
20th-century Australian male singers
Members of the Order of Australia